Lyubishensky is a rural locality (a khutor) in Belogorskoye Rural Settlement, Kumylzhensky District, Volgograd Oblast, Russia. The population was 136 as of 2010.

Geography 
Lyubishensky is located on Khopyorsko-Buzulukskaya Plain, 56 km west of Kumylzhenskaya (the district's administrative centre) by road. Belogorsky is the nearest rural locality.

References 

Rural localities in Kumylzhensky District